Parrett is an English surname. Notable persons with the name include:

Aaron Parrett (born 1967), American professor, author, musician, and letterpress printer
Dean Parrett (born 1991), English footballer
Jeff Parrett (born 1961), American baseball pitcher
William F. Parrett (1825–1895), U.S. Representative from Indiana
William G. Parrett (born 1945), American CPA, management in finance